The National Highway 85 or the N-85 is an under-construction Pakistan National Highway and a major road for accessing southern parts of Baluchistan Province. Running from town of Surab in Kalat District to the town of Hoshab via Panjgur, Nag and Basima in Baluchistan Province of Pakistan, it then connects to M8 motorway. Its total length is 487 km the highway is maintained and operated by Pakistan's National Highway Authority.

See also

References

External links
 National Highway Authority

Roads in Pakistan